The Watonwan River is a tributary of the Blue Earth River,  long, in southern Minnesota in the United States. The Watonwan drains about a quarter of the Blue Earth River's watershed.

The river was the site of the capture of Bob, Cole and Jim Younger (members of the James–Younger Gang) near Madelia in 1876.

Geography

The river's largest tributaries are its north and south forks.

Approximately 84% of the larger watershed of the Blue Earth River, which includes that of the Watonwan River, is used for agricultural cultivation, primarily that of corn and soybeans. Small lakes and wetlands in the Watonwan watershed provide significant habitat for Minnesota's waterfowl population, though many stretches of the river and its tributaries have been subject to ditching and channelization for agricultural production and localized flood reduction.

Flow rate
The highest recorded flow during the period was 13,900 ft³/s (394 m³/s) on June 20, 1993. The lowest recorded flow, caused by an ice dam, was 1.8 ft³/s (0 m³/s) on December 24, 1989.

See also
List of rivers of Minnesota

References

Rivers of Minnesota
Rivers of Blue Earth County, Minnesota
Rivers of Cottonwood County, Minnesota
Rivers of Martin County, Minnesota
Rivers of Watonwan County, Minnesota
Dakota toponyms
Tributaries of the Mississippi River